Kris Welham  (born 10 March 1987) is an English rugby league footballer who plays as a  for Sheffield Eagles in the RFL Championship and the England Knights at international level.

He has played for Hull Kingston Rovers in the Super League and the Bradford Bulls in the Kingstone Press Championship.

Background
Welham was born in Kingston upon Hull, East Riding of Yorkshire, England.

Career
He came up through the ranks at Hull Kingston Rovers, and made his first team début in the 36–10 defeat at Leigh in August 2006. He scored on his National League début and followed that up with a try on his Super League début in the 40–24 defeat by Wigan on 2 September 2006 at Craven Park.

In February 2012, he signed a new three-year deal that will keep him at Craven Park until 2015.

The 2012 season came to an abrupt end for the England Knights centre though, as he suffered a broken leg in a 13-10 defeat by the Catalans Dragons in June, causing him to miss the rest of the season.

Welham has currently appeared in every game during the 2014 season for Hull KR, scoring 5 tries in 14 games.

Bradford Bulls
Welham signed a two-year deal with the Bradford Bulls following the 2015 season.

2016 - 2016 Season

Welham featured in the pre-season friendly against Leeds.

Welham featured in Round 1 (Featherstone Rovers) to Round 6 (Batley Bulldogs). Welham  played in Round 9 (Sheffield Eagles) to Round 23 (Featherstone Rovers). Welham  then played in the Championship Shield Game 1 (Whitehaven) to Game 5 (Swinton Lions) then in Game 7 (Sheffield Eagles) to the Final (Sheffield Eagles). Welham played in the Challenge Cup in the 4th Round (Dewsbury Rams). He scored against Swinton Lions (4 tries), Leigh Centurions (1 try), Sheffield Eagles (4 tries), Dewsbury Rams (7 tries), Workington Town (1 try), London Broncos (2 tries), Halifax (3 tries), Oldham (6 tries) and Whitehaven (1 try).

Salford Red Devils
Following Bradford's liquidation prior to the 2017 season, Welham joined Super League side Salford Red Devils.

He played in the 2019 Super League Grand Final defeat by St. Helens at Old Trafford.

Featherstone Rovers
On 26 October 2020, it was announced that Welham would join Featherstone Rovers for the 2021 season on a one-year deal, with the option of a second year from 2021

Welham played for Featherstone in their 2021 Million Pound Game loss against Toulouse Olympique.

Sheffield Eagles
On 2 Novemher 2021, it was reported that he had signed for Sheffield in the RFL Championship on a one-year deal

Statistics

Statistics do not include pre-season friendlies.

References

External links
Salford Red Devils profile
SL profile

1987 births
Living people
Bradford Bulls players
England Knights national rugby league team players
English rugby league players
Featherstone Rovers players
Hull Kingston Rovers players
Rugby league centres
Rugby league players from Kingston upon Hull
Salford Red Devils players
Sheffield Eagles players